Exploding in Sound is an American independent record label started by Dan Goldin and Dave Spak while students at Northeastern University. It is based in New York City. The label was founded in 2011 and has released albums from Speedy Ortiz, Pile, LVL UP, and Porches.

History

Beginning in Boston 
Dan Goldin had been working at Island Def Jam Music Group but was dissatisfied working with music he didn't quite enjoy as much as the bands he and Spak had been seeing at local shows around the area. While working at Def Jam, Goldin decided to start operating a music blog which was the first appearance of the Exploding in Sound name. According to an interview with Consequence of Sound, Goldin stated: "If I can do this blog long enough to where it develops an audience, I can eventually start a label which in theory, has a built-in audience with that same taste." Together, Goldin and Spak decided it would be a good idea to start a record label to showcase some of the homegrown acts.

Move and first releases 
In 2011, Goldin moved to New York City, which led to the signing of Boston band Pile on October 16 while they were playing a CMJ showcase. At the time, Spak had relocated to Scranton, Pennsylvania. Exploding in Sound's first release was Grass is Green's "Ronson," released on CD followed by Speedy Ortiz's "Sports EP," the label's first record pressing. Before the end of 2012, the label had two more releases including the "Split Dicks" seven-inch split featuring Grass is Green and Two Inch Astronaut, and Pile's "Dripping."

Expansion 
The following summer, Speedy Ortiz released their debut album, Major Arcana on Carpark Records while continuing to be a part of the Exploding In Sound family, with Sadie Dupis providing vocals on Ovlov's "am" released July, 2013. The label would go on to put out a total of 19 additional releases including Massachusetts bands Fat History Month, Krill, Kal Marks and Ponybones (featuring Speedy Ortiz original guitarist Matt Robidoux.) In October 2013, Goldin and Spak put on an unofficial CMJ showcase at the Silent Barn in Brooklyn, New York which also acted as the label's second birthday celebration. According to Stereogum, "It was a feeling that built over the 11-band lineup. It was more than just “a showcase,” it was bigger than CMJ, and it cements EIS as the most exciting rock label in years. This one show had more energy and excitement (both from audience and performers) than entire festivals." Goldin would call the show one of his favorites in a Summer, 2014 interview with Interviewtion. In a 2015 interview with Allston Pudding, Goldin described the showcase as a turning point, one of the "little affirmations here and there that keep it going."

In 2015, Exploding in Sound hosted "a five-day, six-show celebration" in Boston and New York. Said Goldin to The Village Voice, "The idea originally was to have every band that we released something for play at least one of the nights." As of September 2015, the Exploding in Sound roster contains thirty-three artists.

Artists 
 Anna Altman
 Bad History Month
 Baked
 Bethlehem Steel
 Big Heet
 Big Ups
 Blacklisters
 Bueno
 Dan Francia
 Dirty Dishes
 Disco Doom
 Dust from 1000 Yrs
 Eugene Quell
 Ex-Breathers
 Flagland
 Geronimo!
 Gnarwhal
 Grass Is Green
 Human People
 J&L Defer
 Jackal Onasis
 June Gloom
 Kal Marks
 Krill
 Leapling
 Lost Boy ?
 LVL UP
 Maneka
 Milked
 Mister Goblin
 My Dad
 Nyxy Nyx
 Ovlov
 Palehound
 Palm
 Philadelphia Collins
 Pile
 Pony Bones 
 Porches
 Rick Rude
 Rock Solid
 Shady Bug
 Shell of a Shell
 Soft Fangs
 Speedy Ortiz
 Spook the Herd
 Stove
 Swings
 Tall Friend
 Two Inch Astronaut
 Washer
 Water from Your Eyes
 Yazan

References

External links 
 Official site

American independent record labels
Record labels established in 2011
Indie rock record labels
Alternative rock record labels